Marie-Christine Deurbroeck (born 1 February 1957 in Geraardsbergen, East Flanders) is a retired female long-distance runner from Belgium.

Deurbroeck competed for her native country at the 1984 Summer Olympics in Los Angeles, California. There she ended up in 24th place in the women's marathon. Deurbroeck set her personal best in the classic distance (2:32.32) in 1984.

Achievements

References
 sports-reference

1957 births
Living people
Belgian female long-distance runners
Olympic athletes of Belgium
Athletes (track and field) at the 1984 Summer Olympics
World Athletics Championships athletes for Belgium
Belgian female marathon runners
People from Geraardsbergen
Sportspeople from East Flanders